The 2018 IWRF World Championship was the 7th international championship for wheelchair rugby. It was held in Sydney, Australia at the Quaycentre and Genea Netball Centre in Sydney Olympic Park from August 5 to August 10. The tournament was won by Japan, their first title.

The naming rights sponsor of the event was GIO. It was organised by Disability Sports Australia and the International Wheelchair Rugby Federation and was the biggest disability sporting event to be held in Sydney since the 2000 Paralympic Games. Matches were streamed.

Tournament
Twelve teams contested the 2018 IWRF World Championship. The preliminary rounds consisted of a group stage where the teams were split into two leagues which were contested as a round-robin. This was then followed by a round of crossover matches that  determined the semi-finalists.

Preliminary round

Group A

Preliminary round

Group B

Classification rounds

9th–12th places

5th–8th places

Medals round

All-Tournament Team
 0.5 Jonathan Coggan (GBR)
 1.0 Carlos Neme (COL)
 1.5 Cedric Nankin (FRA)
 2.0 Joe Delagrave (USA)
 2.5 Tomas Hjert (SWE)
 3.0 Jim Roberts (GBR)
 3.5 Ryley Batt (AUS)
 MVP Daisuke Ikezaki(JPN)

References

2018
2018 in wheelchair rugby
wheelchair rugby
International rugby union competitions hosted by Australia
2018 in disability sport
International sports competitions hosted at Sydney Olympic Park